Antoinette Lattouf is an Australian journalist, author and diversity advocate. She has worked at Network Ten, ABC, SBS and triple j and guest commentated for a range of online and broadcast publications.

In 2021, she was awarded a Women’s Agenda Leadership Award and B&T Women in Media Champion of Change.

Early life and education
Lattouf's parents came to Australia as refugees from Lebanon in the 1970s. She attended various public schools in Western Sydney and studied Communications (Social Inquiry) at the University of Technology, Sydney.

Career

Advocacy
Lattouf co-founded Media Diversity Australia (MDA) in 2017. The not-for-profit organisation seeks to increase cultural and linguistic diversity in Australia's news media. Advisory board members include Stan Grant, Waleed Aly, Hugh Riminton, Monica Attard, Talal Yassine and Tim Soutphommasane.

In 2020, MDA released their damning report about the lack of diversity in Australian television news and current affairs. Lattouf was a co-author of 'Who Gets To Tell Australian Stories', Australian-first research led by MDA and conducted by Macquarie University, University of Sydney, Deakin University and Western Sydney University with partners Google and the Media Entertainment and Arts Alliance.

Lattouf advocates for more support and awareness for perinatal mental health after struggling with debilitating post natal depression and sharing her journey.

She is also an ambassador for the Australian Thyroid Foundation after a Studio 10 television viewer noticed a lump on her neck and contacted Network 10. As a result Lattouf had surgery to remove the lump and was diagnosed with hashimoto's disease.

Lattouf has spoken out about bullying and racism she experienced whilst working at SBS at the start of her career.

Other work 
In 2019, she was listed in Australian Financial Reviews 100 Women of Influence.

Her first book, ‘How to Lose Friends and Influence White people’ will be published by the Penguin Random House in early 2022.

Controversy
In 2019, a comment breakfast television presenter Kerri-Anne Kennerley made to Lattouf was criticised by feminists and media commentators as 'slut-shaming'. Kennerely asked colleague Lattouf "Did you forget your pants today?" in reference to a playsuit Lattouf was wearing. Kennerley later suggested Lattouf was 'thirsty' a few minutes after the Studio10 panel had discussed it was another word for horny.

Personal life
Lattouf is married and has two daughters. Lattouf is a media personality, a diversity advocate, an author and a mental health ambassador.

References 

Australian women journalists
Australian people of Lebanese descent
Year of birth missing (living people)
Living people